Sinagen is a Torricelli language of Papua New Guinea. Both Sinagen and the closely related Dia language go by the names Alu and Galu.

References

Wapei languages
Languages of Sandaun Province